The 2015–16 Wake Forest Demon Deacons men's basketball team represented Wake Forest University during the 2015–16 NCAA Division I men's basketball season. The Demon Deacons were led by second-year head coach Danny Manning. The team played home games at the Lawrence Joel Veterans Memorial Coliseum in Winston-Salem, North Carolina, and were a member of the Atlantic Coast Conference. The Demon Deacons finished season 11–20, 2–16 in ACC play to finish in 14th place. They lost to NC State in the first round of the ACC tournament.

Previous season
The Demon Deacons finished the season 13–19, 5–11 in ACC play to finish twelfth place. They lost in the first round of the ACC tournament to Virginia Tech.

Departures

Incoming Transfers

Recruiting

Recruiting class of 2016

Roster

Schedule

|-
!colspan=9 style="background:#000000; color:#cfb53b;"| Exhibition

|-
!colspan=9 style="background:#000000; color:#cfb53b;"| Non-conference regular season

|-
!colspan=9 style="background:#000000; color:#cfb53b;"| ACC regular season

|-
!colspan=9 style="background:#000000; color:#cfb53b;"| ACC tournament

References

Wake Forest Demon Deacons men's basketball seasons
Wake Forest